The 2011–12 Green Bay Phoenix men's basketball team represents University of Wisconsin–Green Bay in the 2011–12 NCAA Division I men's basketball season. Their head coach is Brian Wardle. The Phoenix play their home games at the Resch Center and are members of the Horizon League.

Roster

Schedule

|-
!colspan=9 style=|Exhibition

|-
!colspan=9 style=| Regular season

|-
!colspan=9 style=| Horizon League tournament

References

Green Bay Phoenix
Green Bay Phoenix men's basketball seasons
Green Bay Phoenix men's basket
Green Bay Phoenix men's basket